Gelechia rileyella is a moth of the family Gelechiidae. It was described by Vactor Tousey Chambers in 1872. It is found in North America, where it has been recorded from Kentucky, Maine and New Hampshire.

The forewings are pale yellow, faintly tinged with pink and minutely dusted with fuscous. There is a fuscous streak on the base of the costa. The hindwings are a little paler.

References

Moths described in 1872
Gelechia